Cyrioides vittigera, commonly known as the striped banksia jewel beetle, is a species of beetle in the family Buprestidae native to Western Australia. It was described by the French naturalists Francis de Laporte de Castelnau and Hippolyte Louis Gory in 1835.

References

Buprestidae
Beetles described in 1835